Kartabad or Kortabad may refer to:

Kartabad, Lorestan, Iran
Kortabad, South Khorasan, Iran